The Ashmole Bestiary (Bodleian Library MS. Ashmole 1511) is a late 12th or early 13th century English illuminated manuscript Bestiary containing a creation story and detailed allegorical descriptions of over 100 animals. Rich colour miniatures of the animals are also included.

The Aberdeen Bestiary (Aberdeen University Library MS 24) and the Ashmole Bestiary are considered by Xenia Muratova, a professor of art history, to be "the work of different artists belonging to the same artistic milieu." Due to their "striking similarities" they are described by scholars as being "sister manuscripts." The medievalist scholar M. R. James considered the Aberdeen Bestiary ''a replica of Ashmole 1511".

Hugh of Fouilloy's moral treatise on birds, De avibus, is incorporated into the text with 29 full colour illustrations.

External links 
 The Medieval Bestiary
 MS Ashmole 1511 in the Bodleian Libraries Catalogue of Medieval Manuscripts
 MS Ashmole 1511 Images available in Digital Bodleian

References 

13th-century illuminated manuscripts
Bestiaries
Bodleian Library collection